Zhenzhu Yabgu  was a claimant to throne of Western Turkic Khaganate.

Life 
He was Yukuk Shad's son and Illig Khagan's grandson. He was known as El Bi Tardu Shad during his father's reign.

In 653, he succeeded his father in Kunduz. Starting from then, he claimed to be ruler of Western Turks in opposition to Ashina Helu. Later Zhenzhu contacted Tang to receive soldiers and requested to be created a qaghan in 655. Yuan Lichen (元礼臣) was ordered by Gaozong to visit Zhenzhu in 8 November  656 to create him khagan, but he was stopped by Helu's soldiers near Suyab, causing Zhenzhu to lose much prestige.

His territory was also invaded during conquest of the Western Turks and was killed by Ashina Mishe near Shuanghe on March, 659.

References 

7th-century Turkic people
659 deaths
Ashina house of the Turkic Empire